Abbas Mirakhor joined INCEIF in 2010  as Distinguished Scholar and the First Holder of INCEIF's Chair in Islamic Finance. His research interests include conventional and Islamic economics and finance.

Life
Born in Iran, Abbas Mirakhor received PhD from Kansas State University in the USA. From 1968-1984 he taught in various universities after which he joined the International Monetary Fund (IMF) where he remained until retirement in 2008 serving as staff, an Executive Director and the Dean of the Board of that institution.

Education and career
Mirakhor is a graduate of the Kansas State University, USA, where he received his Bachelor, Master and PhD Degrees in Economics. In 1968, he started his academic career with University of Alabama, USA. With the exception of a 2-year stint at the AzZahara University in Tehran, Iran, throughout his academic career, Mirakhor has worked as a professor of economics at the University of Alabama, Alabama A&M University, and the Florida Institute of Technology. In 1984, he joined the IMF in Washington DC as an economist. He spent 24 years with the IMF, serving as the organisation's Executive Director and Dean of the Executive Board, retiring in 2008.

Awards
Mirakhor was conferred the “Order of Companion of Volta” for service to Ghana by the President of Ghana in 2005. In 2003, he received the Islamic Development Bank Annual Prize for Research in Islamic Economics, which he shared with Dr. Mohsin Khan, another well-known economist at IMF. The President of Pakistan conferred him the “Quaid-e Azam” star for service to Pakistan in 1997.

Books
He has published books, papers and research articles on a wide range of areas including microeconomic theory, mathematical economics and Islamic economics. His latest publications are “Islam and Development: The Institutional Framework” which was coauthored with Dr. Idris Samawi Hamid, Professor of Philosophy at Colorado State University, USA; and “Globalisation and Islamic Finance: Convergence, Prospects and Challenges” co-authored with Prof. Hossein Askari of the George Washington University and Dr. Zamir Iqbal of the World Bank.

Notable books
 
 Risk Sharing in Finance: The Islamic Finance Alternative, Zamir Iqbal, Abbas Mirakhor, Hossein Askari, Noureddine Krichene, 2011
 An Introduction to Islamic Finance: Theory and Practice, 2nd Edition, Zamir Iqbal, Abbas Mirakhor, 2011
 The Stability of Islamic Finance: Creating a Resilient Financial Environment for a Secure Future, Hossein Askari, Zamir Iqbal, Noureddine Krichenne, Abbas Mirakhor, 2010
 Globalization & Islamic Finance: Converge, Prospects & Challenges, Hossein Askari, Zamir Iqbal, Abbas Mirakhor, 2009
 New Issues in Islamic Finance and Economics: Progress and Challenges, Hossein Askari, Zamir Iqbal, Abbas Mirakhor, 2009
 An Introduction to Islamic Finance: Theory and Practice, Abbas Mirakhor, Zamir Iqbal, 2006
 Theoretical Studies in Islamic Banking and Finance, Abbas Mirakhor (editor), Mohsin S. Khan, 2005
 Theoretical Studies in Islamic Banking and Finance (1st Edition), Abbas Mirakhor (editor), Mohsin S. Khan, 1988
 Islamic Banking, Abbas Mirakhor, Zubair Iqbal, 1987

References

External links
International Monetary Fund Executive Directors
Islamic Development Bank's (IDB) 2003 prize in Islamic economics
Amazon page for "Theoretical Studies in Islamic Banking and Finance" book
Islamic Economics

Iranian economists
Iranian academics
Iranian emigrants to the United States
University of Alabama faculty
Florida Institute of Technology faculty
Kansas State University alumni
Year of birth missing (living people)
Living people